Cusseta is an unincorporated community in Cass County, Texas, 11.5 miles from Linden.  It is named after Cusseta, Alabama. A post office was established there in 1856. In 2000, the population was 30.

References

Unincorporated communities in Cass County, Texas
Unincorporated communities in Texas